The Men's sprint was held on 16 October 2015.

Results

Qualifying
The top 18 qualify for the match rounds.

1/16 Finals
Winners proceed directly to the 1/8 finals; losers proceed to the repechage.

1/16 Finals Repechages
Winners proceed to the 1/8 finals.

1/8 Finals
Winners proceed directly to the quarter-finals; losers proceed to the repechage.

1/8 Finals Repechages
Winners proceed to the quarter-finals; losers proceed to the race for places 9–12.

Race for 9th place
This ranking final determines the allocation of places 9–12.

Quarter-finals
One-on-one matches are extended to a 'best of three' format hereon.
Winners proceed to the semi-finals; losers proceed to the race for places 5–8.

Race for 5th place
This ranking final determines the allocation of places 5–8.

Semi-finals
Winners proceed to the gold medal final; losers proceed to the bronze medal final.

Finals
The final classification is determined in the medal finals.

References

European Track Championships – Men's sprint
Men's sprint